Drones, also known as Unmanned Aerial Systems/Vehicles (UAS/UAV), or  Remotely Piloted Aircraft, are used in wildfire surveillance and suppression. They help in the detection, containment, and extinguishing of fires. They are also used for locating a hot spot, firebreak breaches, and then to deliver water to the affected site. In terms of maneuverability, these are superior to a helicopter or other forms of manned aircraft. They help firefighters determine where a fire will spread through tracking and mapping fire patterns. These empower scientists and incident personnel to make informed decisions. These devices can fly when and where manned aircraft are unable to fly. They are associated with low cost and are flexible devices that offer a high spatiotemporal resolution.

The data gathered through these devices is unique and accurate as they fly low, slow, and for a long period. They can also collect high-resolution imagery and sub-centimeter data in smoke and at night. It provides firefighters access to real-time data without putting the lives of pilots at risk. Managing a 24/7-drone fleet over any huge forestland is challenging. Public drones pose a danger to wildfire and can cost lives. Fire response agencies are forced to ground their aircraft to avoid the potential for a midair collision. Policies in the United States, Canada, and Australia discourage the use of public drones near wildfires.

Description 

Drones allow firefighters accurate data. By using the real-time data, firefighters can determine where a fire will move next, assisting them in making swift decisions and draw up a strategic plan about movement and evacuation.

Manufacturers equip these devices with infrared cameras that capture wind direction, high-resolution imagery of smoke, and other variables. The capability to operate at a low elevation allows firefighters to use UAVs to identify quick escape routes. These are used in approving flights to monitor massive wildfires in the US Pacific Northwest and in Australia.

The use of UAVs limits exposure and reduces risk to pilots and wildland firefighters. Easily packable and able to fly in remote locations. These can fly as fast as 40 miles an hour. The drone pilots can operate the devices at varying speeds to help people better see what is happening. The transmission from drones or UAVs can be viewed on a laptop computer in a mobile ground station. A drone weighing 15 pounds and a six-foot wingspan, has a range of about eight miles and can stay in the air for an hour without recharging. The aircraft can be programmed to fly on its own, but a safety pilot will monitor operations during the tests. These also serve as tools for starting planned, controlled fires to clear out hard-to-kill underbrush. Drones are a part of fire research and management.

Dragon egg systems 
Drones have also been studied as tools for starting planned, controlled fires to clear out hard-to-kill underbrush. It is called the "Dragon Egg System." These are similar to ping-pong balls but are filled with potassium permanganate powder and injected with glycol and dropped to the target site. The balls ignite about 30 seconds after injection to start a controlled fire.  A master's student from the University of Idaho was the first person to pilot an "unmanned aerial system plastic sphere dispenser" to deploy fire on a federally managed wildfire near Flagstaff, Arizona.

Integration 
Drones are gradually becoming an integral part of the fight against wildfires in the United States, Canada, Australia, Europe, and Thailand.

United States 
The United States is experiencing longer wildfire seasons. According to the U.S. Forest Service, the changing climate has led to longer wildfire season and increased expense in fighting fires. I 2018, the President passed an executive order on wildfire management that called for an increased use of drones.

In the year 2008, NASA's Ikhana unmanned aerial vehicle (UAV) was used in the battle against more than 300 wildfires raging in California. Matrice 600 (M600) was used during the Woodbury Fire on June 8, 2019, about 5 miles northwest of Superior, Arizona.

In the year 2013, the National Guard used a drone for the first time in Yosemite National Park to find a crew that lost connection to the commander. The drones helped in finding the crew in five minutes.

Los Angeles Fire Department first used firefighting drones 2017. In the same year, the federal firefighters used UAVs on 340 wildfires in Oregon. The firefighters made use of drones in 12 states, according to the Department of Interior. Drones were used in 2016 fires in California. The drones are being used by Forest Service crews, Bureau of Land Management and the Oregon Department of Forestry.

Wildfire Management Technology Advancement Act 
In March 2019, the Wildfire Management Technology Act was signed into law as Section 1114 by President Trump. The goal of the bill is to "develop consistent protocols and plans for the use of wildland fires of unmanned aircraft system technologies, including for the development of real-time maps of the location of wildland fires." The bill was introduced in 2015 after the Carlton Complex Fire.

Call When Needed contract 
On May 15, 2018, the U.S. Department of the Interior had awarded a Call When Needed contract to four U.S. companies for small-unmanned aircraft systems services. It was an attempt to combat wildfires. It is a $17 million, one-of-its-kind on-call contract. It allows the agency to obtain fully contractor-operated and maintained small ready-to-be-deployed drones when needed to support wildland fire operations, search and rescue, emergency management in the Contiguous 48 States and Alaska. The companies included in the contract are Bridger Aerospace of Bozeman, Montana, Insitu of Bingen, Washington, Pathways2Solutions of Nashville, Tennessee, and Precision Integrated of Newberg, Oregon.

Canada 
The Alberta government-contracted Elevated Robotic Services, which deploys drones for mining companies to assist firefighters in spotting the location of the blaze. In December 2017, researchers at the University of British Columbia used drones to survey the aftermath of the wildfires in British Columbia.

China 
A computer engineering researcher at Guangdong College of Business and Technology in Zhaoqing, China, Dr. Songsheng Li is working on an autonomous early warning system for wildfires. It uses small drones that patrol forests, gather environmental data, and analyze the threat of fires. The key components of his system include GPS systems, unmanned aerial vehicles (UAVs), and Intelligent Flight Modes.

Netherlands 
The Dutch fire brigade together with the Dutch drone manufacturer, Avy BV are testing a long-range drone to detect & monitor early-stage wildfires for a year since February 2021. The long-range drone is equipped with a stabilized gimbal, including an RGB and a thermal camera. AI is used to recognize the fires automatically.

Types 

Drones come in various sizes and are equipped with a variety of specialized detectors and equipment. There are fire-starting drones that help in limiting the damage caused by wildfires. The hobbyist drones are those piloted by the public. The use of these drones over wildfires is prohibited by the authorities in the United States and Canada. These drones hinder the firefighting operations and prevent the agencies from using aerial techniques.

According to the National Wildfire Coordinating Group (NWCG),  there are four classifications of UAS, based on their capabilities and functions, for wildland fire management purposes. This classification does include specialized aircraft and may not apply to other uses of UAS, such as in military combat. The classifications and their details are as follows:

Operational characteristics

Type 1 and 2 

 Usually, operated by contractors to provide situational awareness (SA) and incident mapping;
 Generally, operate above all other incident aircraft;
 Assigned Victor (AM) or air-to-ground (FM) frequencies are used for communication with the UAS ground crew;
 Equipped with Mode C transponders;
 Includes Scan Eagle, Aerosonde, and Penguin among others.

Type 3 and 4 

 Usually, operated by the agency (NWCG) to conduct tactical SA or map missions around the fireline;
 None are equipped with Automated Flight Following (AFF) equipment
 Assigned FM frequencies are used for communication with the UAS ground crew;
 Not equipped with transponders
 Includes 3DR Solo (RW) and FireFly6 (FW) among others.

Challenges 
Drones assist in wildfire management. Different trees require a unique navigation strategy. Some drones take time to fly through densely covered grounds. Operating drones day and night in harsh weather requires an enormous effort.

A hobbyist drone over a fire puts firefighting risks at a halt and creates a high risk of accidents. Public drones disrupted wildfire operations in several locations. It also forces fire response agencies to ground their aircraft to avoid the potential for a midair collision. There have been more than 100 documented cases of unauthorized drones flying over wildfires. During the Bocco Fire, firefighters had to stop their efforts when an unauthorized civilian drone flew into their airspace. A drone has invaded the airspace above a Minnesota wildfire in each of the last four years since 2016. Interference of public drones create problems for firefighting aircraft, firefighters on the ground, and the public.

Policies

United States

For public 

It is against the law to fly an unauthorized drone near a wildfire, and if caught, the drone could be confiscated by law enforcement, and hefty fines can be imposed in the U.S. Temporary Flight Restrictions (TFRs) are typically put in place during wildfires. It requires aircraft, manned or unmanned, that are not involved in wildfire suppression operations to obtain permission from fire managers to enter specified airspace. It's a federal crime to interfere with firefighting efforts on public lands, and it can lead to 12 months in prison. Congress has authorized the FAA to impose a civil penalty of up to $20,000 against any drone pilot who interferes with wildfire suppression, law enforcement, or emergency response operations. The FAA treats these violations seriously and will immediately consider swift enforcement action for these offenses.

Members of media 
As per the law, the media is not allowed to fly drones near wildfires and never interfere with aviation operations or firefighting missions. Media personnel needs to have a special approval, and to qualify for the special approval process, the operations must directly support a response, relief, or recovery activity benefiting a critical public good. They should be a part of the existing Part 107 Remote Pilot and have the support of the on-scene commander on the ground before application submission. After receiving approval, the media personnel must work with the on-site authority, and never interfere with aviation operations or firefighting missions.

Australia 
Australia's Civil Aviation Safety Authority (CASA) has issued a warning about the drone. The action was taken after viewing footage taken during the Blue Mountains fires in the year 2013. It was against the regulations laid down in CASA regulations.

Canada 
Transport Canada and the British Columbia Wildfire Service banned the use of UAVs or drones near a wildfire.

Notes

References

Further reading 
 
 
 
 
 
 
 
 
 
 
 
 
 
 S. Adams and C. Friedland, "A survey of unmanned aerial vehicle usage for imagery collection in disaster research and management," Jan. 2011.
 
 
 
 
 
 
 
 
 
 
 
 
 
 
 
 
 
 
 
 
 
 
 
 
 
 
 
 
 
 
 
 
 
 

Wildfires
Wildfire suppression
Wildfire suppression equipment
Occupational safety and health
Fire suppression
Natural disasters
Fire prevention
Emergency management
Aerial firefighting
Unmanned aerial vehicles
Wildfire prevention